Schayes is a surname.  Notable people with this name include:

Danny Schayes (born 1959), American basketball player, son of Dolph Schayes
Dolph Schayes (1928–2015), American National Basketball Association Hall of Fame player and coach
Wendy Lucero-Schayes (born 1963), American diver, wife of Danny Schayes